Dustoor (Hindi:; literally Foundation) is an Indian television drama-series that was directed by Gurbir Singh Grewal of Neem ka Ped fame. The series was written by Dr.F.S.Shirani. Kahani Ghar Ghar Ki famous TV actress Sakshi Tanwar started her career from this serial.

Dastoor first aired in 1997-98 on the Indian state television channel DD National, which is owned and operated by Doordarshan network.

Cast
 Sakshi Tanwar
 S M Zaheer
 Alka Amin
 Hema Singh
 Sanjay Sharma
 Arun Bali
 Hemant Mishra
 Babla Kochhar

References

DD National original programming
Indian television soap operas
1997 Indian television series debuts
1998 Indian television series endings